Gökay is a Turkish name and may refer to:

 Gökay Iravul, Turkish footballer
 Bahadır Gökay, Turkish painter

Turkish-language surnames
Turkish masculine given names